A sixth referendum on the Compact of Free Association was held in Palau on 21 August 1987, after the previous five referendums had failed to achieve the 75% in favour necessary. Voters were asked whether they approved of the Compact of Free Association between Palau and the United States signed on 10 January 1986. It was approved by 73.0% of voters, with a turnout of 74.7%.

Results

References

1987 referendums
1987 in Palau
Referendums in Palau